Václav Balšán (19 November 1914 – 18 November 1972) was a Czechoslovak racewalker (of the AC Sparta Prague and Spartak Nusle Club) who established the 1945 world record of 42 minutes and 31 seconds in a 10,000 metres race. He was the champion on this distance at Czechoslovak Athletics Championships in 1945, 1946, 1948 and 1949. He also won the silver medal in 1954.

References

1914 births
1972 deaths
Date of death missing
Czechoslovak male racewalkers